L.A. Burdick is a chocolatier begun in the 1970s. It has six locations: three in Massachusetts, and a single location in New York City, Chicago, and Washington D.C.

History 
In the late 1970's, Larry Burdick trained as a chocolatier in Bern, Switzerland. Upon completing his training, he returned to the US and began offering a variety of luxury products, such as truffles, bonbons, his signature chocolate mice, and an assortment of  hot chocolate powders specifically to high end restaurants. He wanted to create chocolate confections that showed the quality of chocolate. He knew that  the majority of chocolate in the US was mass-produced, using low-quality cocoa and high amounts of sugar for flavor. This realization motivated him to bring about a change in the chocolate industry in the US. 

The first L.A. Burdick shop opened its doors in New York in 1987. Five years later, Larry Burdick and his family relocated the business to Walpole, New Hampshire. From there, they continued to expand their reach, opening additional locations in Massachusetts and other parts of the US.

The Head Chocolatier 
For the past 19 years, Michael Klug has held the position of head chocolatier at L.A. Burdick Chocolates. Originally from Montabaur, Germany, Klug has enjoyed a 35-year career, working at some well known restaurants in the United States and Germany, including a one-star Michelin.

Chocolate and Delicacies 
L.A. Burdick's chocolate is sourced from Switzerland, France, and Venezuela, using cocoa beans from South and Central America as well as the Caribbean. They avoid using any extracts or artificial flavorings. They offer a variety of distinct hot chocolates ranging from dark, milk, and white. They provide a range of hot chocolate beverages, including dark, milk, and white chocolate variations. They have a rotational monthly menu that is from a different country and people can choose this option as well.

Locations and Design 
L.A. Burdick has a total of six locations. Each of the locations have the same overall theme which was done by the help of Paula Burdick, Larry Burdick's wife, who attended The Fashion Institute of Technology and assisted in the design of shops in Paris. The locations are Parisian style and make use of tones of brown to compliment wood elements. The first location in New York City was opened in 1987 following the second location in New Hampshire in 1997. The third location was in Cambridge, Massachusetts. The fourth location opened its doors in the heart of the city of Boston on Newbury Street in 2012. The fifth location opened in 2017 and the most recent has been in Washington D.C. in 2020.

References 

Wikipedia Student Program
Chocolatiers